The 2001 1000 km of Estoril was the fourth race of the 2001 European Le Mans Series season.  It took place at Autódromo do Estoril, Portugal, on July 15, 2001.  

Although it was planned for 1000 km, the race had to be stopped when it ran over its 6-hour maximum limit.  The overall winner in LMP, as well as the class winners in GTS and GT, each won automatic entry to the 2002 24 Hours of Le Mans. The winning team was initially disqualified after the podium ceremony for an incident with Tom Coronel's Audi during the race, but later reinstated.

Official results

Class winners in bold.

Statistics
 Pole Position - #7 Johansson Motorsport - 1:28.876
 Fastest Lap - #7 Johansson Motorsport - 1:31.341
 Distance - 874.038 km
 Average Speed - 145.52 km/h

References

External links
 Official Results
 World Sports Racing Prototypes - Race Results

Estoril
6 Hours of Estoril
1000km of Estoril